is a passenger railway station located in the city of Kawagoe, Saitama, Japan, operated by the East Japan Railway Company (JR East).

Lines

Station layout
The station consists of an island platform serving two tracks. Many trains cross here on the otherwise single line. The station is staffed.

Platforms

History
The station opened on 22 July 1940. With the privatization of Japanese National Railways (JNR) on 1 April 1987, the station came under the control of JR East.

Passenger statistics
In fiscal 2019, the station was used by an average of 3021 passengers daily (boarding passengers only).
The passenger figures for previous years are as shown below.

Surrounding area
 Tokyo International University
 Shobi University
 Kasumigaseki Station (Tōbu Tōjō Line)

Matoba Station is approximately a 10-minute walk from the Kawagoe-Matoba Bus Stop on the Kan-Etsu Expressway, which is served by long-distance bus services operated by Seibu Bus to destinations including Niigata, Toyama, Nagano, Karuizawa, and Kanazawa.

See also
 List of railway stations in Japan

References

External links

 JR East station information 

Railway stations in Saitama Prefecture
Kawagoe Line
Stations of East Japan Railway Company
Railway stations in Kawagoe, Saitama
Railway stations in Japan opened in 1940